A lift table is a device that employs a scissors mechanism to raise or lower goods and/or persons.  Typically lift tables are used to raise large, heavy loads through relatively small distances. Common applications include pallet handling, vehicle loading and work positioning.  Lift tables are a recommended way to help reduce incidents of musculoskeletal disorders by correctly re-positioning work at a suitable height for operators. Lift tables lend themselves to being easily adapted to a specific use. They can work in hostile environments, be manufactured in stainless steel and have equipment like conveyors, turn-tables, barriers and gates easily added to their deckplates.

Use

Lift tables can come in a vast array of configurations and can be built to suit various highly specialized industrial processes.  The most common lift table design incorporates hydraulic cylinders and an electrically powered pump to actuate the scissor lifting mechanism.  Lift tables can also be driven by pneumatic sources, trapezoidal-threaded screw drives, push chains or by hydraulic foot pump when the load is not heavy.  Lift tables can be mounted in a pit for floor-level loading, especially useful for access by manual pallet-pump trucks and the mobility impaired or wheelchair users.

Industries that commonly use lift tables include woodworking, upholstered furniture manufacturing, metalworking, paper, printing and publishing, warehousing and distribution, heavy machinery and transportation.

Common uses
Common uses of lift tables include
 Vehicle loading and docking operations
 Mobility impaired access (see below)
 Work positioning and ergonomic handling
 Load positioning (e.g. when integrated into conveyor systems)
 Materials positioning in machine feeding applications
 Pallet and roll cage handling
 Furniture upholstery

Safety

Standards
In Europe there is a published standard BS EN 1570: 1998 + A2: 2009 Safety requirements for lifting tables.  Standard EN 1570-1 is now EN 15701-1:2011+A1:2014. It is a Type C standard and compliance with this standard confers conformity with the Machinery Directive, 2006/42/EC. Work is already being undertaken to revise this standard and possibly split it into 3 parts.  It specifies the criteria for the raising and lowering of goods and/or persons associated with the movement of goods carried by lifting tables.  

In North America, the American National Standards Institute (ANSI) approved and published the ANSI MH29.1:2012 standard in February 2012, itself a revision of the previous MH29.1:2008 standard.

Common accidents
The most common types of accidents involving a scissor lift caused by misapplication of the machine, obstacles, misuse of the equipment, and lack of maintenance.

See also
 Aerial work platform
 Kitchen appliance lift
 Lift table bellows
 Motorcycle lift

References

Ergonomics